Aghur castle is a historical castle located in Abhar County in Zanjan Province, The longevity of this fortress dates back to the Timurid Empire.

References 

Castles in Iran